Megachile manicata is a species of bee in the family Megachilidae. It was described by Giraud in 1861.

References

Manicata
Insects described in 1861